Stella LeSaint (née Razeto; December 17, 1881 September 21, 1948) was an American silent film actress.

Career
Born in San Diego, California, LeSaint worked as a stage actress and in vaudeville, founding Stella Razeto and Company in New York City. She left stage acting because of illness.

LeSaint began acting in films in 1913. She worked with the Selig Polyscope Company but left in 1916 to join the Universal Company. She starred with William Garwood in films such as Lord John in New York.

In 1917, LeSaint left films to return to the stage, but by 1935, she had returned to films, acting mostly in uncredited bit parts.

Personal life
She married Edward LeSaint on December 25, 1913, and remained with him until his death on September 10, 1940. She died on September 21, 1948, in Malibu, California, and is buried in Hollywood Forever Cemetery.

Although she took Le Saint as her married name, "she kept Razetto/Razeto for all professional dealings".

Partial filmography

Notes

References

External links

 

American film actresses
American silent film actresses
1881 births
1948 deaths
Vaudeville performers
Actresses from San Diego
20th-century American actresses